Irudini Umali Thilakarathna is a Sri Lankan cinema, teledrama and stage actress. She was awarded the best actress in 2017 for her role in "Bohimiyanuwa" in both Sumathi Tele Awards and Raigam Tele Awards. In addition to working in Sri Lanka, she is an established and recognised actress in Japan, frequently contributing to Japanese production in both theatre and film.

Personal life 
Umali was married to Sri Lankan actor Saranga Disasekara, they divorced in 2018.

Filmography

Television

Short films 

 Miss You (2022) 
 Moment (2021)
 Alice - Christmas Tele Film (2021)

Awards

References

External links 

One Single wish! Daily News (Sri Lanka)
සාරංගගෙයි අම්මාගෙයි ආදරය මැද කාලය ගෙවනවා

Sri Lankan film actresses
Living people
Sinhalese actresses
1987 births